The Senior men's race at the 1999 IAAF World Cross Country Championships was held at the Barnett Demesne/Queen’s University Playing Fields in Belfast, Northern Ireland, United Kingdom, on March 28, 1999.  Reports of the event were given in The New York Times, in the Glasgow Herald, and for the IAAF.

Complete results for individuals, for teams, medallists, and the results of British athletes who took part were published.

Race results

Senior men's race (12 km)

Individual

†: Julio Rey of  finished 24th in 41:15 min, but was disqualified.

Teams

Note: Athletes in parentheses did not score for the team result

Participation
An unofficial count yields the participation of 165 athletes from 46 countries in the Senior men's race.  This is in agreement with the official numbers as published.  The announced athlete from  did not show.

 (6)
 (1)
 (6)
 (4)
 (3)
 (4)
 (6)
 (1)
 (1)
 (4)
 (1)
 (1)
 (6)
 (6)
 (1)
 (4)
 (4)
 (6)
 (1)
 (6)
 (4)
 (1)
 (6)
 (3)
 (5)
 (5)
 (2)
 (6)
 (3)
 (2)
 (3)
 (1)
 (6)
 (2)
 (1)
 (1)
 (4)
 (6)
 (2)
 (4)
 (1)
 (3)
 (6)
 (6)
 (4)
 (6)

See also
 1999 IAAF World Cross Country Championships – Men's short race
 1999 IAAF World Cross Country Championships – Junior men's race
 1999 IAAF World Cross Country Championships – Senior women's race
 1999 IAAF World Cross Country Championships – Women's short race
 1999 IAAF World Cross Country Championships – Junior women's race

References

Senior men's race at the World Athletics Cross Country Championships
IAAF World Cross Country Championships